Marian L. Maloney (August 16, 1924 – May 29, 2010) was a Canadian Senator. Born in Ponteix, Saskatchewan, Maloney is a graduate of Fort William Collegiate Institute and Kings Business College in Thunder Bay, Ontario. From 1968 to 1978, she worked in customer service and administrative positions in both Thunder Bay and Toronto. In 1970, she founded Marian Maloney & Associates, an event management firm. She was married to Anthony William Maloney (1928–2004), a former justice of the Supreme Court of Ontario. They had three sons: James, Partick, and Michael.

She was summoned to the Senate of Canada for the Ontario senatorial division of Surprise Lake on the advice of Prime Minister Jean Chrétien in 1998. A Liberal, she served for 1 year and 2 months until mandatory retirement in 1999.

She died in Toronto on May 29, 2010.

References
 
 
 

1924 births
2010 deaths
Canadian senators from Ontario
Women members of the Senate of Canada
Liberal Party of Canada senators
Women in Ontario politics